Viktor Knoch (born 12 December 1989) is a Hungarian Olympic gold medalist short track speed-skater. He represented Hungary at 4 Winter Olympic games in 2006, 2010, 2014, and 2018.

External links
Viktor Knoch at ISU

References

1989 births
Living people
Hungarian male short track speed skaters
Olympic short track speed skaters of Hungary
Olympic medalists in short track speed skating
Olympic gold medalists for Hungary
Short track speed skaters at the 2006 Winter Olympics
Short track speed skaters at the 2010 Winter Olympics
Short track speed skaters at the 2014 Winter Olympics
Short track speed skaters at the 2018 Winter Olympics
Medalists at the 2018 Winter Olympics
World Short Track Speed Skating Championships medalists
Sportspeople from Pécs
Universiade gold medalists for Hungary
Universiade medalists in short track speed skating
Competitors at the 2013 Winter Universiade
20th-century Hungarian people
21st-century Hungarian people